A tornado outbreak occurred on Saint Patrick's Day in the Deep South. Mississippi and Alabama were greatly affected, with numerous tornadoes being confirmed, including four that were rated EF2. Six people were injured by four different tornadoes across Alabama during the outbreak. A non-tornadic fatality also occurred due to a car crash near Natchez, Mississippi. The outbreak began the day before, with a couple tornadoes in Mississippi, and continued over the next two days. The storm moved eastward and affected portions of Florida, Georgia, the Carolinas, and Virginia on March 18, spawning more tornadoes and causing wind damage before the storms pushed offshore that night. In total, 51 tornadoes were confirmed during the event, including 25 in Alabama, making it the sixth-largest tornado event in the state's history, and is sometimes locally referred to as the Saint Patrick's Day tornado outbreak of 2021. The same areas would be hit again by a more significant and destructive tornado outbreak sequence one week later.

The extratropical cyclone responsible for the tornado outbreak also resulted in a severe late-season blizzard in parts of the Southern Plains, particularly in the Texas and Oklahoma panhandles.

Meteorological synopsis

On March 16, an enhanced risk for severe weather was issued for northeastern Texas Panhandle northeastward into south central Kansas for the possibility of very large hail. Slight and marginal risk areas, however, covered a much larger area, covering most of the Southern Plains and eastward into Georgia. This included a large 5% tornado risk stretching from the eastern Texas Panhandle into western Mississippi Widespread strong to severe thunderstorms affected areas from Texas and Kansas to Alabama. In southern Mississippi, a cluster of storms bought wind, hail, and tornado damage to Copiah and Simpson Counties. Another cluster of supercells and multi-cell clusters formed in the Texas Panhandle and moved northeastward through western and northern Oklahoma. A tornado was reported on the south side of Hobart, although it was later determined to be a gustnado instead. As the night progressed, a squall line developed in Western Texas and steadily organized as it moved eastward overnight producing more severe weather.

The main day of the outbreak was March 17. It was forecasted well in advance; on March 13, the Storm Prediction Center highlighted a large area of severe potential, including all of Mississippi. By March 14, the entire state and the surrounding areas were contained within a 30% risk contour. Two days later, the SPC upgraded portions of Arkansas, Mississippi, Tennessee, and Alabama to a Moderate risk for severe weather, including a 15% risk area for tornadoes. Early on March 17, the SPC issued a high risk, the first such outlook in two years, for portions of Mississippi, Alabama, and Louisiana. By 12:30 p.m CDT, the high risk area included a 45% risk area for tornadoes across a small portion of the Mississippi–Alabama state line.

Throughout the day, the Storm Prediction Center issued three particularly dangerous situation (PDS) tornado watches for areas of Alabama and Mississippi. These included much of central Alabama and Mississippi at 11:35 a.m. CDT; northern Louisiana, many of the remaining counties in Mississippi, and a handful of counties in Arkansas at 11:55 a.m. CDT; and then a second PDS watch for eastern Mississippi and much of Alabama at 6:45 p.m. CDT. There were 10 other tornado watches issued throughout the day as well.

The first tornado of the day, rated EF2, touched down west of Waynesboro, Mississippi just after 12:00 p.m. CDT on March 17, causing major damage to chicken houses and trees. In the Burnsville, Alabama, area another strong EF2 tornado destroyed multiple mobile homes, heavily damaged a frame home, and injured two people. The strongest tornado of the day was a high-end EF2 tornado that damaged or destroyed multiple homes and mobile homes, and also tossed vehicles near Billingsley, Alabama. Another EF2 tornado struck Silas, snapping numerous trees in and around town. Despite the high potential for long-tracked and violent tornadoes, the four EF2 tornadoes were the only strong (EF2+) tornadoes that were confirmed. In all, 33 tornadoes were confirmed that day.

More severe and tornadic weather was expected on March 18 along the Atlantic coast from Florida to Southern Maryland and a moderate risk was issued from eastern Georgia to north central North Carolina on March 17. The moderate risk was downgraded to enhanced on March 18 due to a lack of buoyancy in the atmosphere, but numerous strong to severe thunderstorms still tracked through the area during the afternoon. Dozens of weak tornadoes were confirmed before the storms moved offshore that evening.

Confirmed tornadoes

March 16 event

March 17 event

March 18 event

Impact

Southeastern United States

More than 40,000 homes and businesses were without electricity across Louisiana, Alabama and Mississippi. Two people were injured when a home was destroyed in Clarke County, Alabama. Four other homes were also destroyed, and some chicken farms.

In Mississippi's largest city of Jackson, ABC station WAPT was knocked off the air due to a 2-hour power outage caused by lightning, that caused alarm systems to go off in the studio.

Southern Plains

In parts of the Southern Plains, the large extratropical cyclone associated with the tornado outbreak also resulted in a severe blizzard early on March 17. Blizzard Warnings were issued across most of the Texas and Oklahoma panhandles, including the Amarillo area, late on March 16. Zero visibility was reported in much of the area under a Blizzard Warning. Extremely heavy snowfall rates and wind gusts of over  resulted in long-duration blizzard conditions as well. Numerous crashes occurred on major roadways, and several highways, including I-40 and US-287 had to be closed. Amarillo, Texas saw almost  of snow, and nearby areas saw even more. The blizzard was also followed by a flash freeze overnight on March 17, resulting in a freeze-up of snow-covered roadways and more crashes overnight.

See also
List of North American tornadoes and tornado outbreaks
List of Storm Prediction Center high risk days
April 2016 North American storm complex
Tornado outbreak and blizzard of April 13–15, 2018
Tornado outbreak sequence of March 24–28, 2021

Notes

References

External links

2021 in Alabama
2021 in Mississippi
2021 natural disasters in the United States
March 2021 events in the United States
Tornadoes in Alabama
Tornadoes in Mississippi
Tornadoes in Louisiana
Tornadoes in Arkansas
Tornadoes in Missouri
Tornadoes of 2021
2020–21 North American winter
Blizzards in the United States
Extratropical cyclones
F2 tornadoes